Allium humile is an Asian  species of wild onion found at high elevations (4000–4500 m) in India (Jammu-Kashmir, Uttarakhand, Uttar Pradesh,  Himachal Pradesh), Nepal, northern Pakistan, Tibet, and Yunnan.

Allium humile has narrow, cylindrical bulbs. Scape is up to 15 cm tall, slightly compressed. Leaves are flat, fleshy, linear, about 5 mm wide. Umbel is hemispheric, crowded with many flowers. Tepals are white with yellowish-green midveins.

The species formerly included a variety Allium humile var. trifurcatum F.T.Wang & Tang which is since 1991 called Allium trifurcatum (F.T.Wang & Tang) J.M.Xu.

References

humile
Onions
Flora of China
Flora of Pakistan
Flora of West Himalaya
Plants described in 1843